The Heat Latin Music Awards is an annual awards show that airs on the HTV cable channel, which is usually held in early June, that honors the year's biggest Latin music acts, as voted by HTV viewers. The show features numerous celebrity guests and musical acts.

Ceremonies
The Heat Latin Music Awards are held in Punta Cana, Dominican Republic.

Award categories

Current categories
 Best Music Video
 Best Male Artist
 Best Female Artist
 Best Group or Band
 Best Rock Artist
 Best Pop Artist
 Best Urban Artist
 Best Tropical Artist
 Best Artist Northern Region
 Best Artist Andean Region
 Best Artist Southern Region
 Best New Artist

Defunct categories
 Best Artist Pop/Rock (2015)

Special awards
The winners of these awards are chosen by the HTV staff, not the viewers. There is the Commitment Artist Award (2015–present) and the Gold Artist Award (2015–present).

Engagement Award
 Juan Luis Guerra (2015)
 Luis Fonsi (2016)
 Victor Manuelle (2017)

Gold Award
 Juanes (2015)
 Ricardo Montaner (2016)
 Carlos Vives (2017)

Most wins

Most nominations

External links

References

International music awards
Latin music awards
Awards established in 2015
Spanish-language music